John Wesley is a 1954 British historical film directed by Norman Walker and starring Leonard Sachs, Neil Heayes and Keith Pyott. It depicts the life of the father of Methodism, John Wesley. The film was financed by J. Arthur Rank, a prominent Methodist layman, and with contributions from the church.

Plot
Rescued from a burning house as a child, John Wesley (Leonard Sachs) believes the experience marked him for a higher purpose, a ‘brand from the burning.’ The film follows Wesley's years at Oxford and as a clergyman, his disagreements with the church over the social position of the clergy, his mission to America, the founding of Methodism, and his bringing of the Gospel into the lives of ordinary people.

Cast

Critical reception
Allmovie wrote, "the budget didn't allow for a professional cast, thus many potentially worthwhile scenes are laid low by amateurish acting. On the other hand, the film is quite slick and accomplished on a technical level, thanks to the first-rate cinematography of Hone Glendenning and the assured direction of Norman Walker"; while TV Guide gave the film three out of five stars, noting, "This handsomely mounted biography of the title Methodist leader was originally conceived as a short black-and-white film, but was expanded to include more of Wesley's life and work...The plot is minimal, focusing on the young Wesley's studies and the development of his principles, but the production values are excellent and Leonard Sachs' Wesley is superb. The initial release of the film went to some 500 churches that contributed to the $200,000 budget in return for first rights
on viewing."

References

External links

1954 films
British biographical films
1950s English-language films
Films set in the 18th century
Films set in England
Films about Christianity
Biographical films about religious leaders
1950s historical films
British historical films
Films shot at Station Road Studios, Elstree
1950s British films